Eduard Uhl (12 December 1813 – 1 November 1892) was a mayor of Vienna.

References 

Mayors of Vienna
1813 births
1892 deaths